Jessica & Krystal is a 2014 South Korean reality-variety show that aired on OnStyle starring Korean American sisters Jessica Jung, then member of Girls' Generation, and Krystal Jung of f(x).

Background 
Jessica & Krystal takes the viewers behind the scenes, to unveil Jung Soo Yeon and Jung Soo Jung's normal, everyday life as sisters and friends. The use of the pair's Korean names implies that the viewers will be seeing an up-close and personal side of the two sisters, instead of their stage appearance as Jessica & Krystal. CJ E&M OnStyle's CP Kim Ji Wook stated, "The one-of-a-kind Jung sisters' real lifestyle will be unveiled. We ask that you show a lot of interest and anticipation for the reveal of the lovely sisters' private stories."

Episodes

Reception
Jessica & Krystal received a 4.6% online-streaming rating for its 1st episode, which is 15 times higher than the ratings for the channel's previous program at the same time-slot.

References 

Girls' Generation television series
F(x) (group) reality shows
2014 South Korean television series debuts
2014 South Korean television series endings
Television series by CJ E&M